A training workshop is a type of interactive training where participants carry out a number of training activities rather than passively listen to a lecture or presentation. Broadly, two types of workshops exist: A general workshop is put on for a mixed audience, and a closed workshop is tailored towards meeting the training needs of a specific group.

References

Training